Archibald C. "Archy" Freeman (August 13, 1847 – January 26, 1918) was an American soldier who received the Medal of Honor for valor during the American Civil War.

Biography
Freeman joined the Army from Newburgh, New York, in July 1862, claiming to be 18 years old. He served in the 124th New York Infantry and was promoted to Corporal less than two weeks prior to his MOH action. He received the Medal of Honor on December 1, 1864, for his actions at the Battle of Spotsylvania Court House, and was mustered out with his regiment in June 1865.

After the war, he moved to Limestone County, Texas, where he married Orena A. McBay.

They seem to have had six children, two daughters, and four sons. They had five of their children that lived to adulthood.

Medal of Honor citation
Citation:

The President of the United States of America, in the name of Congress, takes pleasure in presenting the Medal of Honor to Private Archibald Freeman, United States Army, for extraordinary heroism on 12 May 1864, while serving with Company E, 124th New York Infantry, in action at Spotsylvania, Virginia, for capture of flag of 17th Louisiana (Confederate States of America).

See also

List of American Civil War Medal of Honor recipients: A-F

References

External links

Military Times

1847 births
1918 deaths
20th-century American people
American Civil War recipients of the Medal of Honor
Military personnel from New York (state)
Military personnel from Texas
People from Limestone County, Texas
People from Newburgh, New York
People of New York (state) in the American Civil War
People of Texas in the American Civil War
Union Army soldiers
United States Army Medal of Honor recipients